The 2018 Pan American Track Cycling Championships took place at the Aguascalientes Bicentenary Velodrome, in Aguascalientes, Mexico,  from August 29 until September 2, 2018. The event served as a qualifier for the 2019 Pan American Games.

Medal summary

Men

Women

Medal table

References

External links
Results book

Pan American Road and Track Championships
Americas
Cycling
International sports competitions hosted by Mexico
Sport in Aguascalientes
August 2018 sports events in Mexico
September 2018 sports events in Mexico
Qualification tournaments for the 2019 Pan American Games